Ithomia iphianassa is a species of butterfly of the family Nymphalidae. It is found in Central and northern South America.

feed on plants of the family Solanaceae, such as Cuatresia riparia, Cuatresia morii,  and Acnistus arborescens.

Subspecies
Ithomia iphianassa iphianassa (Venezuela)
Ithomia iphianassa panamensis Bates, 1863 (Panama)
Ithomia iphianassa anaphissa Herrich-Schäffer, 1865 (Colombia)
Ithomia iphianassa phanessa Herrich-Schäffer, 1865 (Ecuador, Colombia)
Ithomia iphianassa alienassa Haensch, 1905 (Colombia)
Ithomia iphianassa ethilla Neustetter, 1929 (western Colombia)

In addition, there is one unnamed subspecies from Ecuador.

References

Butterflies described in 1947
Ithomiini
Nymphalidae of South America